Demographics of Ireland may refer to:

 Demographics of the Republic of Ireland
 Demography of Northern Ireland
 Irish population analysis (island)